Altamir Heitor Martins  (January 14, 1980March 1, 2012) was a Brazilian professional footballer who played for BEC Tero Sasana F.C.

Career
Martins transferred from Guarani Futebol Clube to FC National București in October 2006. He made three appearances for National in Liga I during the 2006–07 season. The defender joined in summer 2009 from Romanian second league side FC Progresul București to Paykan F.C. After a half year with Paykan F.C. was released and moved to Thai club BEC Tero Sasana F.C. Then few months later with BEC Tero Sasana F.C., he was released.

Death
In March 2012, Martins died in Curitiba aged 32.

References

External links
 Profile at CBF.com.br

1980 births
2012 deaths
Brazilian footballers
Expatriate footballers in Iran
Paykan F.C. players
FC Progresul București players
Expatriate footballers in Thailand
Association football defenders
Footballers from São Paulo